The Sonoma Valley Sun, also known as the Sonoma Sun is a bi-weekly newspaper serving the city of Sonoma, California and surrounding Sonoma Valley communities with news reporting, graphics, and photography. The paper is published in both English and Spanish.

References

External links
 

Mass media in Sonoma County, California
Newspapers published in the San Francisco Bay Area
Sonoma Valley